The 8th Korfball World Championship was held in Brno (Czech Republic) on November 1–10, 2007 with 16 national teams in competition.

The best 8 teams qualified for the World Games 2009 in Kaohsiung, Chinese Taipei.

These days was also played the final match of the European Bowl with the champions of the Eastern and Western divisions, Slovakia and Wales.

Teams

Pool matches
Legend

Second round

Title pools
Done with the two best teams in every pool of the first round, carrying forward their match result.

Pools for 9th–16th places
Done with the two last teams in every pool of the first round, carrying forward their match result.

Semifinals

13th–16th places

9th–12th places

5th–8th places

Championship semifinals

FINALS

15th–16th places

13th–14th places

11th–12th places

9th–10th places

7th–8th places

5th–6th places

3rd–4th places

FINAL

Final standings

See also
Korfball World Championship
International Korfball Federation

External links
World Championship website
International Korfball Federation

Korfball World Championship
Korfball World Championship
IKF World Korfball Championship
International sports competitions hosted by the Czech Republic
Sport in Brno
Korfball in the Czech Republic